The 2020 Esiliiga B was the 8th season of the Esiliiga B, third-highest Estonian league for association football clubs, since its establishment in 2013.

Teams
Of the 10 participating teams 6 remained following the 2019 Esiliiga B. The 2019 champions FC Nõmme United, runners-up JK Vaprus Vändra and 3rd placed Pärnu were promoted to the Esiliiga, while 10th placed Põhja-Tallinna JK Volta were relegated to the II liiga. The four new sides in this year's campaign are Tartu JK Welco, Rakvere JK Tarvas, Läänemaa JK and Tallinna Kalev II.

Stadia

League table

Results

Rounds 1–18

Rounds 19–27

See also
 2019–20 Estonian Cup
 2020–21 Estonian Cup
 2020 Meistriliiga
 2020 Esiliiga

References

External links
Official website

Esiliiga B seasons
3
Estonia
2020–21 in European third tier association football leagues